Shatalov is a relatively small lunar impact crater on the far side of the Moon. It is located to the west-southwest of the Mare Moscoviense, one of the few lunar maria on the far side. To the east-southeast of Shatalov along the edge of the Mare Moscoviense is the larger crater Belyaev.

This is a bowl-shaped crater with a circular outer rim, a fairly typical appearance for a lunar crater of this size. Attached to the outer rim along the northeastern side is a small, cup-shaped impact crater. The interior of Shatalov is not marked by any impacts of significance.

References

 
 
 
 
 
 
 
 
 
 
 
 

Impact craters on the Moon